The 2007 FC Moscow season was the club's 4th season in existence after taking over the licence of Torpedo-Metallurg in 2004. They finished the season in 4th place, qualifying for the UEFA Cup, were runners up to Lokomotiv Moscow in the 2006–07 Russian Cup and were knocked out of the 2007–08 Russian Cup at the Quarterfinal stage by Amkar Perm.

Season events
Following the completion of the season, Leonid Slutsky left the club, with Oleg Blokhin being appointed as the club's new manager on 14 December.

Squad

On loan

Left club during season

Transfers

In

Out

Loans out

Released

Competitions

Premier League

Results by round

Results

League table

Russian Cup

2006–07

Final

2007–08

Squad statistics

Appearances and goals

|-
|colspan="14"|Players away from the club on loan:
|-
|colspan="14"|Players who appeared for Moscow but left during the season:

|}

Goal scorers

Clean sheets

Disciplinary record

References

FC Moscow seasons
Moscow